Bases loaded is a baseball term meaning runners on first, second, and third base.

Bases Loaded may also refer to:

 Bases Loaded (video game)
 Basses Loaded, an album by the Melvins